Programme level refers to the signal level that an audio source is transmitted or recorded at, and is important in audio if listeners of Compact Discs (CDs), radio and television are to get the best experience, without excessive noise in quiet periods or distortion of loud sounds. Programme level is often measured using a peak programme meter or a VU meter.

The level of an audio signal is among the most basic of measurements, and yet widespread misunderstanding and disagreement about programme levels has become arguably the greatest single obstacle to high quality sound reproduction.

How it works 
Live sound covers an enormous range of levels, but this is not something that can be demonstrated with a conventional sound level meter. Sound level meters respond quite slowly, even on a "fast" setting: they use a root mean square (RMS) rectifier which by definition must take a slow running average of the square of the input voltage. Music is complex, and constantly varying, with brief peaks originating from many sources including the initial impact of sticks on cymbals and drums. A loud band might measure 100 dB SPL on a sound level meter, yet have peaks reaching 130 dB SPL or higher.

A recording system must handle these peaks; they can be measured using a peak responding meter with an integration time of 0.5 ms or less (not a standard IEC type PPM which has a longer integration time).

The sound level meter is useless for properly assessing noise levels, since the commonly used A-weighting is based on equal-loudness contours for pure tones, and is not valid for the random noise.

The subjective loudness of noise is best measured using a noise-meter to the ITU-R 468 noise weighting standard. The chart below shows, on this basis, the real range of live music, and then the level capabilities of various stages in the audio chain, from microphone to loudspeaker.

Analysing programme levels 

This chart is based on the assumption that what goes in should come out—true high-fidelity—and so an Alignment Level (AL) corresponding to 100 dB SPL has been assumed throughout. Any lower level would imply severe clipping at the first stage; the master recording. Top quality microphones do not present a problem; most will handle 130 dB SPL without severe distortion, and a few manage more than 140 dB SPL.

The master recording process, using current 24-bit techniques, offers around 99 dB of "true" dynamic range (based on the ITU-R 468 noise weighting standard); identical to the dynamic range of a good studio microphone, though very few recordings will use just one microphone, and so the noise on most recordings is likely to be the sum of several microphones after mixing, and probably at least 6 dB worse than shown.

See also 
Audio system measurements
Equal-loudness contour
Fletcher–Munson curves
Noise measurement
Weighting filter

External links 
EBU Recommendation R68-2000
AES Preprint 4828 - Levels in Digital Audio Broadcasting by Neil Gilchrist (not free)
EBU Recommendation R117-2006 (against loudness war)
AES Convention Paper 5538 On Levelling and Loudness Problems at Broadcast Studios
EBU R89-1997 on CD-R levels

Audio engineering
Broadcast engineering
Sound production technology
Sound recording
Sound